Sternwarte Sirius is an astronomical observatory owned and operated by Stiftung Sternwarte Planetarium SIRIUS. It is located at Schwanden above Sigriswil in the Canton of Berne, Switzerland.

External links
Sternwarte Sirius 

Sirius
Buildings and structures in the canton of Bern